Air Marshal Sir Charles Ernest Ness,  (4 April 1924 – 13 September 1994) was a senior Royal Air Force commander.

RAF career
Ness joined the Royal Air Force in 1943 and served as an observer during the Second World War. In 1965 he became Officer Commanding the RAF Steamer Point in Aden where he had to cope with the growing terrorist threat. He became deputy director of Manning at the Ministry of Defence in 1967, Air Commander in Gibraltar in 1971 and Director of Organisation and Administration Plans in 1974. He went on to be Commander at Headquarters Southern Maritime Air Region in 1975, Director-General of Personnel Management in 1976 and Air Member for Personnel in 1980 before retiring in 1983.

In retirement he became Chairman of the Air League.

References

 

1924 births
1994 deaths
Knights Companion of the Order of the Bath
Commanders of the Order of the British Empire
Royal Air Force air marshals
Royal Air Force personnel of World War II